Christian Bonnet (14 June 1921 – 7 April 2020) was a French politician.

Biography
Christian was the oldest son of Pierre Bonnet and Suzanne Delebecque. He had two younger brothers: Didier and Jean-Claude. His grandfather, Charles Bonnet, married Claire Vaillant de Guélis, related to François-Michel le Tellier, Marquis de Louvois.

He graduated from Sciences Po and earned a doctorate in law. He was a member of the Popular Republican Movement, then of the Independent Republicans, and finally the Union for French Democracy. He was chairman of the supervisory commission of Caisse des Dépôts et Consignations from 1971 to 1972.

He was appointed Minister of the Interior on 30 March 1977, following the resignation of Michel Poniatowski. His notable events in office include the arrest of Jacques Mesrine and the 1980 Paris synagogue bombing.

Christian Bonnet died on 7 April 2020 at the age of 98 in Vannes.

References

1921 births
2020 deaths
20th-century French politicians
French interior ministers
French Ministers of Agriculture
Independent Republicans politicians
Mayors of places in Brittany
Politicians from Paris
Popular Republican Movement politicians
Union for French Democracy politicians